Saba Qom Football Club (Bashgah-e Futbal-e Sâbay-e Qâm) was an Iranian football team based in Qom, Iran. The club was dissolved in 2018. The team is a former part of Saba Battery Club, owned by Saba Battery Co., and was moved to Qom in 2007, although they were formerly registered as a team from Tehran playing at Shahid Derakhshan Stadium of Robat Karim.

Saba won the 2005 edition of the Hazfi Cup and the 2005 edition of the Iranian Super Cup.

History
 
Mohemmat sazi Football Club was Iranian football club based in Tehran, Iran. They play in the 2nd Division.

Establishment
In 1974 a football called Mohemat Sazi was established in Tehran. The team never had any major success and only played in the lower leagues of the Iranian football league system. They came close to making it to Tehran's top football league in the Elyas Talebi 1980s. In the early 1990s the club was sponsored by a company named Maham. During the later stages of the club's history they were sponsored by Sanam, an electronics company.

Takeover
In 2002 the club's shares were sold to Saba Battery Company (also known as Niru Company) which is under the control of Iran's Ministry of Defense.
Due to the club's greatly improved financial status the team was able to purchase talented players and were promoted to the Iran Pro League in 2004.

Domestic Titles

2004–2005
In the first year of participation in Iran Pro League, Saba Battery managed to participate in the AFC Champions League for the first time ever, After becoming champions of the Hazfi Cup
under Milan Živadinović. In the 2005 season Saba Battery also won the Iranian Super Cup,  defeating Foolad the Iran Pro League champion 4–0.
And until 2016 they remained the only team to have the title.

2006–2007
Although Saba Battery did not have a successful year in Iran Pro League, they were competitive in the Hazfi Cup. Saba Battery became Runners-up after losing to Sepahan 4–2 in aggregate, with Mohammad Hossein Ziaei. Since Sepahan became 5th in the Iran Pro League, that meant that Saba Battery won't be going to AFC Champions League.

Iran Pro League
The team debuted in the Iran Pro League in the 2004–05 season and made the headlines when they signed Iranian legend and FIFA all-time greatest international goalscorer Ali Daei from Persepolis. With the help of Daei the team was able to secure a berth for the Asian Champions League after winning the 2005 Hazfi Cup, however failing to make it out of their group. In the same year Saba won the Iranian Super Cup defeating league champions Foolad 4–0. After the departure of Ali Daei in 2006, Saba signed former Bosnia and Herzegovina international Alen Avdić as his replacement. In 2007 Saba once again made the final of the Hazfi Cup, this time losing 4–0 to Sepahan on aggregate.

Move to Qom
In 2008 Saba relocated to Qom because the city of Tehran had many football teams with low attendance figures. The team was renamed Saba Qom after the move. Saba was one of the few teams of the league in 2008–09 season which did not change managers during the season and finished in 6th position at the end of the season something that happened again in the next season.
In the 2011–12 Persian Gulf Cup, Saba Qom finished 4th securing a play-off spot for the 2013 AFC Champions League. In the play-off Saba lost to Al Shabab on penalties and failed to qualify to the group stage.

Ali Daei Era
In July 2015 Saba announced that legendary former Iranian footballer and coach Ali Daei would lead the club for the 2015–16 Persian Gulf Pro League season. Daei attracted several former national team players to the club, namely: Hamed Lak, Ghasem Dehnavi, Amir Hossein Sadeghi, Reza Haghighi, Mohammad Ghazi and Hashem Beikzadeh. Saba started well and were within contention of an AFC Champions League in the first half of the season, but in the second half they faltered and eventually finished in seventh place.

Season-by-season
For details on seasons, see List of Saba Qom F.C. seasons

The table below chronicles the achievements of Saba Qom in various competitions since 2002.

See also
 Saba Qom futsal Club
 Saba Novin Qom Football Club

References
 

Saba Qom
Sport in Qom
Football clubs in Iran
Association football clubs established in 1974
1974 establishments in Iran
Association football clubs disestablished in 2018
2018 disestablishments in Iran